Jeamie Deacon, also referred to as Jamie Deacon, is an Ireland women's rugby union international and an Ireland women's rugby sevens international. Deacon represented Ireland at the 2017 Women's Rugby World Cup. Deacon is also a former Ireland women's field hockey international. Between 2007 and 2009 she was named three times as an NFHCA All-American while playing field hockey for Michigan State Spartans. She also won Irish Senior Cup and Women's Irish Hockey League titles with UCD.

Early years, family and education
Deacon is the daughter of Niall and Anne Deacon. Her father played rugby union for Enniscorthy. She was raised in the Killanne/Ballinlug district of County Wexford, near Enniscorthy. She was educated at Newtown School, Waterford,  Michigan State University and at University College Dublin.

Field hockey

Old Alex
In 2005–06 while playing for Old Alex, Deacon was named the club's Young Player of the Season. In 2006–07 she was named club Player of the Season. She was also the club's leading goalscorer for the season. In 2006 Deacon also played for  Old Alexandra in the Irish Senior Cup final, losing 1–0 against Hermes.

Michigan State Spartans
Between 2007 and 2009 Deacon attended Michigan State University on a hockey scholarship. She majored in Civil Engineering and played for Michigan State Spartans in the 2007, 2008 and 2009 NCAA Division I Field Hockey Championships. Deacon was named as an NFHCA All-American in all three years she played for Michigan State Spartans.

Railway Union
Deacon played for Railway Union during the 2010–11 season.

UCD
Deacon began playing for UCD in 2011. She subsequently played for UCD in three successive Irish Senior Cup finals. In 2012, along with Chloe Watkins, Dora Gorman, Anna O'Flanagan and Deirdre Duke, she was a member of the UCD team that defeated Loreto 3–2. UCD where finalists again in 2013 but this time Deacon finished on the losing side as they lost 3–2 to Railway Union. In 2014 Deacon played in a third Irish Senior Cup final with UCD as they defeated Pembroke Wanderers 2–0 in the final. Her teammates on this occasion included Anna O'Flanagan, Deirdre Duke, Nicola Evans, Katie Mullan, Emily Beatty and Gillian Pinder. The 2013–14 season saw UCD and Deacon complete a national double after they also won their first Women's Irish Hockey League title. Deacon also played for UCD in the 2015 EuroHockey Club Champions Cup. While attending University College Dublin, Deacon also qualified as a teacher.

Ireland international
Deacon represented Ireland at Under-18 and Under-21 levels. She was also included in the senior squad for the 2006 Celtic Cup.

Rugby union

Clubs
Deacon first played rugby union at Under-10 and Under-12 level with Enniscorthy. However, after starting at Newtown School, Waterford she switched to field hockey. In 2013 she began training and playing for Blackrock College.

Leinster
Deacon has also represented Leinster in the IRFU Women's Interprovincial Series

Ireland international
Deacon was included in the 2015 Women's Six Nations Championship squad  but did not get to play. On 14 November 2015 she made her international debut in an 8–3 defeat against England in an Autumn International at Twickenham Stoop. Deacon represented Ireland at the 2017 Women's Rugby World Cup.

Deacon is also an Ireland women's rugby sevens international.

Teacher
Deacon is a Maths teacher at The High School, Dublin. She has also coached the High School's rugby union  and field hockey teams.

Honours

Field hockey
UCD
Women's Irish Hockey League
Winners: 2013–14
Irish Senior Cup
Winners: 2011–12, 2013–14
Runners Up: 2012–13
Old Alexandra
Irish Senior Cup
Runners Up: 2005–06
Individual
NFHCA All-American
Winner: 2007, 2008, 2009

References

Living people
1987 births
Irish female rugby union players
Ireland women's international rugby union players
Ireland international women's rugby sevens players
Leinster Rugby women's players
Blackrock College RFC players
Rugby union players from County Wexford
Ireland international women's field hockey players
Irish female field hockey players
UCD Ladies' Hockey Club players
Railway Union field hockey players
Women's Irish Hockey League players
Michigan State Spartans field hockey players
Expatriate field hockey players
Irish expatriates in the United States
Female field hockey midfielders
People educated at Newtown School, Waterford
Alumni of University College Dublin
Irish field hockey coaches
Irish rugby union coaches
Irish schoolteachers
Sportspeople from County Wexford
Mathematics educators